Vələsli is a village and municipality in the Davachi Rayon of Azerbaijan. It has a population of 329.  The municipality consists of the villages of Vələsli and Ceyranlı.

References

Populated places in Shabran District